The Union for Democracy and Progress (UDP) is a political party in Mauritania. The UDP is led by Naha Mint Mouknass, and as of early 2008 it is the only political party in Mauritania that is headed by a woman.

History
It was founded on 11 June 1993 by Hamdi Ould Mouknass (Naha's father) who previously served as Minister of Foreign Affairs under President Moktar Ould Daddah.

In the 2001 parliamentary elections the party received 8.1% of the popular vote and won three of the 81 seats. In the 2006 parliamentary elections, it won 3 of the 95 seats, whilst in the Senate elections in 2007 it won one of the 56 seats. The party supported Sidi Ould Cheikh Abdallahi in the March 2007 presidential election and was part of the presidential majority following his victory. However, after the formation of the government of Prime Minister Yahya Ahmed Ould El Waghef in May 2008, the party left the presidential majority in June 2008, objecting to the composition of the government. It said that, while the opposition had been brought into the government, the UDP had been marginalized; the party also said that "the hope for change born on August 3, 2005 has been compromised", referring to the ouster of President Maaouya Ould Sid'Ahmed Taya on that date.

References

Political parties in Mauritania
Political parties established in 1993
1993 establishments in Africa